Xylophanes cthulhu is a moth of the  family Sphingidae. It is known from lowland rainforest in Guatemala and Costa Rica.

The wingspan is 76–82 mm. It is similar to Xylophanes neoptolemus but distinguishable by the overall brighter colour and the more acutely falcate tip of the forewing, a pure black basal area to the hindwing and a golden yellow band between the first and fourth postmedian lines on the forewing underside

Adults are on wing year-round in Costa Rica.

The larvae feed on Ludwigia species. They have a snake-like appearance. The head and the three thoracic segments can be retracted into abdominal segment one, which is swollen and adorned with a pair of light-ringed grey eye-spots.

References

cthulhu
Moths described in 2008